Ivar Mendez  is a neurosurgeon, neuroscientist and Professor of Surgery at the University of Saskatchewan. He is internationally known for his work in cell transplantation for Parkinson's disease and the use of remote presence robotics in neurosurgery and primary health care.

Mendez served as the F.H. Wigmore Professor and Provincial Head of the Department of Surgery at the University of Saskatchewan and the Saskatchewan Health Authority from 2013-2022 for the Province of Saskatchewan. He also holds an appointment at the Department of Psychology and Neuroscience at Dalhousie University and he is one of the founders of the Brain Repair Centre. He is also the president and founder of the Ivar Mendez International Foundation that is dedicated to providing health and educational assistance to children in the Bolivian Andes. Mendez is a photographer and sculptor and has published four books of photography.

Biography 
Mendez was born in La Paz, Bolivia and immigrated with his family to Canada as a teenager. He obtained a BSc degree from the University of Toronto and then an M.D. from the University of Western Ontario (UWO). He did a neurosurgical residency training in London, and was certified in Neurosurgery from the Royal College of Physician and Surgeons of Canada in 1994 and from the American Board of Neurological Surgery in 1996.  He became a fellow of the American College of Surgeons in 1998 and became a member of the College Board of Governors in 2015. His interest in regenerative medicine led him to obtain a PhD in Anatomy and Neurobiology from the UWO his PhD thesis was on "Neurotransmitter Interactions in Nigral Grafts". He did a postdoctoral fellowship at the University of Lund in Sweden under the supervision of Anders Björklund, considered the "father" of cell transplantation in Parkinson's disease. In 2014, Saint Mary's University (Halifax) in Nova Scotia awarded Mendez a Doctor of Science (honoris causa) degree for his contribution to Neuroscience and he was inducted a Fellow to the Canadian Academy of Health Sciences. In 2016, Dr. Mendez received the Government of Canada Public Service Award of Excellence for the use of remote presence robotic technology to improve healthcare in the Canadian North. In December 2022, Dr. Mendez was appointed an officer of the Order of Canada for his pioneering work in the use of remote telemedicine and robotics to revolutionize the delivery of health and patient care in Canada and worldwide.

Scientific contributions 
He pioneered the technique of multiple grafts to restore dopamine input to the parkinsonian mammalian brain. This technique was translated into clinical trials in patients with Parkinson's disease and showed long-term survival of those grafts. He also pioneered the use of Glial Derived Neurotrophic Factor (GDNF) in combination with fetal cells in humans. Mendez invented a transplantation delivery system to inject cells into the human brain. With his team, he performed the first long-distance brain surgery robotic telementoring in the world by using a robotic arm to mentor neurosurgeons located 400 km away.
 He is also pioneering the use of remote presence devices to deliver health care in remote locations.
In 2015, Mendez and his team printed the first 3D brain for planning deep brain stimulation surgery. Research in 3D brain printing led in 2016 to the development of a virtual reality (VR) brain for medical education and surgical planning applications. In 2020, Dr. Mendez and his remote presence technology team pioneered the use of telerobotic ultrasonography for abdominal and obstetric sonography. This technology was used to provide prenatal ultrasound to pregnant women living in COVID-19 outbreak communities.

Inventions 
 Neural transplantation delivery system: Canadian Patent #2,281,007 and US Patent #7,137,969
 Injection delivery system: US Patent #8,753,314 and US patent #9,067,028

Humanitarian contributions 
Mendez has established a Canadian charitable organization, the Ivar Mendez International Foundation, to provide nutrition, dental care and art program to children in remote locations of the Bolivian Andes.

Awards 
 Officer of the Order of Canada 2022
 Government of Canada Public Service Award of Excellence 2016
 Queen Elizabeth II Diamond Jubilee Medal
 Humanitarian of the Year Award, Canadian Red Cross - Atlantic Region
 Ten most influential Hispanics in Canada
 Dr. John Savage Memorial Award
 Royal College Medal Award - Medalist in Surgery

Artistic endeavours 
He has published four books of photography  and has had several exhibitions of his photography and sculpture   In October 2003 He sculpted a bust of Canadian Neurosurgeon Dr. Charles Drake was installed outside the front entrance of University Hospital in London, Ontario where Drake practiced medicine. The statue was unveiled by American Actress and Singer Della Reese whose life was saved by Drake following an Aneurysm in October 1979.

Published books 
 Bolivia. Mendez, I. . Glen Margaret Publishing 2006.
 Illimani. Mendez, I. . Glen Margaret Publishing 2010.
 Bolivia - 2nd Edition. Mendez, I. . Glen Margaret Publishing 2012.
 Sariri. Mendez, I. . SPC Impresores S.A. 2013.
 Sariri. Travels Through Bolivia. Mendez, I. . ynwp (Regina, Canada). 2022.

Selected scientific publications

References 

Canadian neurosurgeons
Canadian neuroscientists
Canadian medical researchers
Bolivian emigrants to Canada
Bolivian scientists
Canadian photographers
Canadian sculptors
Canadian male sculptors
Academic staff of the Dalhousie University
Academic staff of the University of Saskatchewan
Roboticists
Canadian philanthropists
Canadian people of Bolivian descent
Bolivian neurosurgeons
People from La Paz
Living people
Year of birth missing (living people)
Officers of the Order of Canada